Chilabothrus, commonly known as the Greater Antillean boas or  West Indian boas, is a genus of nonvenomous snakes the family Boidae. The genus is endemic to the West Indies. 12 or 14 species are recognized as being valid.

Distribution
Species of Chilabothrus are found throughout the West Indies, from the Lucayan Archipelago to the Virgin Islands and all four of the Greater Antilles.

Species

) Not including the nominate subspecies.
T) Type species.

Nota bene: A taxon author in parentheses indicates that the species was originally described in a genus other than Chilabothrus.

References

Further reading
Duméril A-M-C, Bibron G (1844). Erpétologie générale ou Histoire naturelle complète des Reptiles, Tome sixième [Volume 6]. Paris: Roret. xii + 609 pp. (Chilabothrus, new genus, pp. 562–563). (in French).

 
Snake genera
Taxa named by Gabriel Bibron
Taxa named by André Marie Constant Duméril
Snakes of the Caribbean